Christoph Klippel (born November 2, 1986) is a German footballer who plays as a defender for Carl Zeiss Jena II.

Career

Klippel began his career with FV Dresden-Nord (later renamed SC Borea Dresden), before joining Dynamo Dresden in July 2009, as a reserve team player. He was promoted to the first-team in November 2009, by new coach Matthias Maucksch, and made his debut in a 2-0 3. Liga defeat against SpVgg Unterhaching. After a year with Dynamo, he moved on to Hallescher FC, joining SV Meppen a year later. After one season, he was on the move again, signing for Sportfreunde Siegen. In July 2013 he signed for Viktoria Berlin where he had another one-year spell before joining Carl Zeiss Jena.

External links

1986 births
Living people
German footballers
Dynamo Dresden players
Dynamo Dresden II players
Hallescher FC players
SV Meppen players
Sportfreunde Siegen players
FC Carl Zeiss Jena players
3. Liga players
Association football defenders
Association football midfielders
FSV Budissa Bautzen players
FC Viktoria 1889 Berlin players
Footballers from Dresden